A winter storm is a storm in the winter, which produces precipitation that occurs in below-zero temperatures.

Winter storm or variations may also refer to:

Weather
 Winter storm watch
 Winter storm warning

Military
 Operation Winter Storm (1942) a WWII German operation to breakout from the encirclement of Stalingrad
 Operation Winter Storm (1944) a WWII German and Axis offensive on the Gothic Line, see Battle of Garfagnana

Other uses
 Winterstorm (song), a 2002 song by Machinae Supremacy
 Winter Storms (film), a 1924 German film
 WinterStorm, a music festival held anually

See also

 My Winter Storm (2007 album), an album by Tarja Turunen
 Northeast Snowfall Impact Scale
 List of Northeast Snowfall Impact Scale winter storms
 Thundersnow
 Nor'easter
 Winter (disambiguation)
 Storm (disambiguation)
 Snowstorm (disambiguation)
 Blizzard (disambiguation)
 Big Snow (disambiguation)